Theodor Johnsson is a Swedish professional ice hockey defenceman who plays for the Malmö Redhawks of the SHL. He spent his junior years in the Växjö Lakers organization, where he also made his SHL debut.

On 9 May 2022, Johnsson left Växjö to sign a one-year contract with fellow SHL club, Malmö Redhawks.

Career statistics

References

External links

2003 births
Living people
Malmö Redhawks players
People from Helsingborg
Swedish ice hockey defencemen
Sportspeople from Skåne County
Växjö Lakers players